Karim Tarfi (born 5 July 1993 in Jette) is a Belgian professional footballer who plays as a midfielder. He formerly played for Anderlecht and De Graafschap.

External links
 Voetbal International profile 

1993 births
Living people
Belgian footballers
Belgium youth international footballers
Belgian expatriate footballers
Expatriate footballers in the Netherlands
R.S.C. Anderlecht players
De Graafschap players
Eerste Divisie players
People from Jette

Association football midfielders
Footballers from Brussels